John Murphy (23 May 1772 in Shandon, Cork – 1 April 1847, in Cork)  was an Irish Roman Catholic Bishop in the nineteenth century.

Murphy commenced his priestly studies in Paris, leaving due to political unrest, he completed his studies at the Irish College at Lisbon he was ordained a priest in Lisbon on 10 May 1795. He was, consecrated Coadjutor Bishop of Cork on 21 February 1815 and its Diocesan on 23 April that year. He was a founding member of the Cork Savings Bank.
He clashed with many groups during his episcopate before dying suddenly during the famine.
Bishop Murphy is buried in St. Mary's Cathedral, where he had been baptised and served in as bishop.

References

1772 births
1847 deaths
19th-century Roman Catholic bishops in Ireland
Roman Catholic bishops of Cork